Honorifics are a class of words or grammatical morphemes that encode a wide variety of social relationships between interlocutors or between interlocutors and referents.  Honorific phenomena in Thai include honorific registers, honorific pronominals, and honorific particles.

Historical development
Thai honorifics date back to the Sukhothai Kingdom, a period which lasted from 1238 to 1420 CE  During the Sukhothai period, honorifics appeared in the form of kinship terms.  The Sukhothai period also saw the introduction of many Khmer and Pali loanwords to Thai. Later, in the Ayutthaya Kingdom (1351 to 1767 CE), a new form of honorific speech evolved.  While kinship terms continued to be used, a royal vocabulary known as "raja-sap" emerged.  The Raja-sap, an honorific register, was created as a way for commoners and aristocrats alike to talk to and about the king of Thailand.  Soon after its creation, the use of royal vocabulary was extended to address all members of the royal family as well as aristocrats. At the same time, a clerical vocabulary used to talk to or about monks arose, very similar to the raja-sap.  With the development of royal and clerical vocabularies, means for honorific speech increased significantly.  The Bangkok period, from 1782 to the present, saw even greater expansion of the raja-sap as it became the formal, or polite, way to address all peoples or topics.  Specifically, lexical items from honorific registers replaced native Thai pronouns, resulting in an entirely new set of pronominal forms.  Kinship terms continued to be used as honorifics, and a new type of honorific emerged as well, polite particles.

Honorific registers

The roots of Thai honorific registers lie in Khmer and Khmero-Indic (Pali or Sanskrit words borrowed first into Khmer, then from Khmer into Thai) loanwords.  Khmer and Khmero-Indic words were originally borrowed into Thai by an educated, Thai upper class, specifically kings and monks, in order to discuss Buddhism.  When the need for honorific registers arose, the Thai people turned again to Khmer.  Borrowing heavily from Khmer, the Thai constructed a royal vocabulary, a large lexicon of Khmer and Khmero-Indic words, appropriate for addressing the monarchy.  At the same time, a clerical vocabulary emerged, much smaller but similar in function and origin to the royal vocabulary.  The clerical vocabulary, also composed mainly of borrowings from Khmer, enabled the common people to communicate with and about monks.  Lexical items from standard Thai, royal vocabulary, and clerical vocabulary are shown side by side in the table below:

Honorific pronominals

Personal pronouns
Personal pronouns are the most numerous and complex of pronominal forms in Thai.  Personal pronouns may make the following semantic distinctions:
Number: singular, plural, ambiguous
Person: first person, second person, third person, ambivalent
Gender
Primary distinctions are distinctions of gender that are inherent to pronouns: male, female
Secondary distinctions are distinctions of gender that depend on the presence or absence of other semantic features like status, intimacy, or non-restraint: male orientation, female orientation, neutral orientation
Age: absolute, relative
Speaker-addressee-referent relationship
Primary distinctions
Status-the status of the speaker relative to an addressee or referent. Status may be determined by relative age (elders have higher status), rank (king>royalty>monks>government and military>professionals>white collar>blue collar), or non-intimacy (strangers are treated as at least equals)
Intimacy - the kind and degree of close, day-by-day association
Non-restraint
Secondary distinctions
Deference
Politeness
Assertiveness

Kinship terms
Kinship terms are used pronominally to elevate or demonstrate solidarity with an addressee.  To address a listener as kin is, in effect, to confer the listener with the same status as the aforementioned kin.  Generally, kinship terms contain both literal and displaced meanings.  Kinship terms are considered literal in cases of blood kin, affinal kin, and teknonymy.  They are considered displaced when used with kinlike individuals: intimate friends of kin or kin of intimate friends.  When using kinship terms, age is critical.  Speakers must estimate the age of an addressee to determine his or her generation and choose an appropriate kinship term.  
Kinship terms commonly used as honorific pronominals are summarized in the table below. 

Speakers may demonstrate additional respect by adding the polite title khun (คุณ) before any kinship term.  Kinship terms are commonly followed by personal names or nicknames.

Status terms
Status terms denote referents in terms of occupation or status.  While some status terms are used as first, second, or third person pronouns, others are restricted to second and third person only.  Many pronominal status terms are preceded by titles.  Status terms may also be used as titles before given names.   A few status terms frequently used as pronominals are presented in the table below:

Names
In Thai, a person's full name consists of a given name followed by a surname or family name.  In addition, most individuals have a nickname.  As pronominals, given names are used most frequently in second person form.  Given names are often preceded by the courtesy title khun when addressing friends or acquaintances.  Given names are sometimes truncated to convey mild informality.  Nicknames, like given names, are used most often in second person.  They generally do not take titles.  Nicknames are a friendly, affectionate way to show intimacy between interlocuters.

Honorific particles
Honorific particles are added to the end of an utterance or clause to show respect to the addressee.  Honorific particles may exhibit the following semantic distinctions:
Sex: male, female, neutral
Status: superior, equal, inferior
Social mood: a continuum ranging from formal at one end to extremely intimate at the other
Illocutionary force: affirmative, imperative, interrogative
Polite particles are not used in conjunction with honorific registers or in written language.  Commonly used polite particles are summarized in the table below.

Honorific titles

Thanphuying and khunying
Thanphuying and khunying were originally titles for wives of nobles of chaophraya and phraya rank, respectively. Today they are used as titles for married female recipients of the Order of Chula Chom Klao. Those of the rank Dame Grand Commander and above use the title thanphuying, while others use khunying.

Khun (courtesy title) 
Khun, a courtesy title pronounced with a middle tone, should not be confused with the noble title of khun (pronounced in a rising tone). Today, this word is used informally to courteously address nearly anyone.

References

Honorifics by country
Thai language
Thai culture